The river Ticino (French and) is the most important perennial left-bank tributary of the Po. It has given its name to the Swiss canton through which its upper portion flows.

It is one of the four major rivers taking their source in the Gotthard region, along with the Rhône, Reuss and Rhine.

Name
The name may have meant "the runner," from Proto-Indo-European *tekʷ-ino-s, from *tekʷ- (“to run, flow”).

Course
The river rises in the Val Bedretto in Switzerland at the frontier between the cantons of Valais and Ticino, is fed by the glaciers of the Alps and later flows through Lake Maggiore, before entering Italy. The Ticino joins the Po a few kilometres downstream (along the Ticino) from Pavia. Beneath it flows the Anza, a right-bank tributary of the Ticino.

The river is dammed in Switzerland in order to create hydroelectricity, while in Italy it is primarily used for irrigation.

History
The legendary Gallic leader Bellovesus was said to have defeated the Etruscans here in circa 600 BC. Ticino was the location of the Battle of Ticinus, the first battle of the Second Punic War fought between the Carthaginian forces of Hannibal and the Romans under Publius Cornelius Scipio in November 218 BC.

In the Middle Ages Pavia (first capital of the Kingdom of the Lombards  and then of the kingdom of Italy) was, thanks to the waters of the Ticino, became a fundamental hub for communications and trade between Venice and the Po valley. Furthermore, still in Pavia, there was the only brick bridge (ponte Coperto) which until the 19th century crossed the Ticino from Lake Maggiore to the Po.

The Ticino was in the territory of the Duchy of Milan during much of the later medieval and early modern period, although its upper portion as far as Bellinzona in 1500 and as far as the shores of Lago Maggiore in 1513, fell to the Old Swiss Confederacy as a result of the Swiss campaigns in the Italian Wars.

Towns and tributaries

Val Bedretto

Val Bedretto, a narrow alpine valley named after the village of Bedretto, culminates in Nufenen Pass, Italian Passo della Novena, at  located between Pizzo Gallina and Nufenstock. Through it runs the border between the cantons of Valais and Ticino. A road constructed in 1964 goes over the pass ultimately leading to the Rhône Valley on the other side. French is mainly spoken in Valais but near the Pass, German is spoken. The population of Ticino speaks Italian.

The road up the Val is fairly straight until it approaches the pass, where it becomes hairpin. Currently, it is a base for skiing and hiking. The Val is subject to avalanches and snow can remain on the ground as late as September.

Below Bedretto the Ri di Cristallina, "Cristallina stream", comes in from the right at Ossasco, and further down Fontana, still in Bedretto. The entire area is laced with hiking trails and mountain huts.

Valle Leventina
 Airolo

Other
 in Switzerland: Bellinzona, Locarno (on Lake Maggiore).
 in Italy: Stresa (on Lake Maggiore), Vigevano, Pavia.

Tributaries
The Ticino has the following tributaries (R on the right bank, L on the left, looking downstream):

 Brenno (L)
 Moesa (L) 
 Verzasca (Lake Maggiore, R)
 Maggia (Lake Maggiore, R)
 Cannobino (Lake Maggiore, R)
 Giona (Lake Maggiore, L)
 Tresa (Lake Maggiore, L)
 Boesio (Lake Maggiore, L)
 San Bernardino (Lake Maggiore, R)
 Toce (Lake Maggiore, R)
 Stronetta (Lake Maggiore, R)
 Bardello (Lake Maggiore, L)
 Arno (L)
 Roggia Vernavola (L)

References

External links
 Photo gallery about the Ticino Valley Natural Park made by a UNESCO photographer.

 
 
Rivers of Ticino
Waterways of Italy
Rivers of the Province of Novara
Rivers of the Province of Varese
Rivers of the Province of Milan
Rivers of the Province of Pavia
International rivers of Europe
Tributaries of Lake Maggiore
Rivers of Italy
Rivers of Switzerland
Braided rivers in Italy